This is a list of Prairie View A&M Panthers football players in the NFL Draft.

Key

Selections

References

Prairie View AandM

Prairie View A&M Panthers NFL Draft